Procynodictis ("before Cynodictis") is an extinct genus of placental mammals from clade Carnivoraformes, that lived in North America from early to middle Eocene.

Phylogeny
The phylogenetic relationships of genus Procynodictis are shown in the following cladogram:

See also
 Mammal classification
 Carnivoraformes
 Miacidae

References

Miacids
Eocene mammals of North America
†